Kim Victoria Cattrall (born 21 August 1956) is a British and Canadian actress. She is known for her role as Samantha Jones on HBO's Sex and the City (1998–2004), for which she received five Emmy Award nominations and four Golden Globe Award nominations, winning the 2002 Golden Globe for Best Supporting Actress. She reprised the role in the films Sex and the City (2008) and Sex and the City 2 (2010).

Cattrall made her film debut in Rosebud (1975) and went on to appear in various television roles. She came to prominence in the 1980s with films such as Ticket to Heaven (1981), Police Academy (1984), City Limits (1985), Big Trouble in Little China (1986), Mannequin (1987), Masquerade (1988), Midnight Crossing (1988), and The Return of the Musketeers (1989). She worked on several occasions with director Bob Clark, appearing in four of his films: Tribute (1980), Porky's (1981), Turk 182 (1985), and Baby Geniuses (1999). Her other film credits include The Bonfire of the Vanities (1990), Star Trek VI: The Undiscovered Country (1991), Split Second (1992), Above Suspicion (1995), 15 Minutes (2001), Crossroads (2002), Ice Princess (2005), My Boy Jack (2007), The Ghost Writer (2010), and Meet Monica Velour (2010).

On stage, Cattrall appeared in the 1986 Broadway production of Michael Frayn's Wild Honey. Her other stage credits include August Strindberg's Miss Julie (McCarter Theatre Center, 1993), William Shakespeare's Antony and Cleopatra (Liverpool Playhouse, 2010), Noël Coward's Private Lives (Broadway, 2011), and Tennessee Williams' Sweet Bird of Youth (The Old Vic, 2013).

From 2014 to 2016, Cattrall starred and served as executive producer on the HBO Canada series Sensitive Skin, for which she received a nomination for the Canadian Screen Award for Best Actress in a Comedy Series. She later starred on the Paramount+ streaming television series Tell Me a Story, Fox drama Filthy Rich and Peacock drama Queer as Folk. As of 2022, she stars in How I Met Your Father as Future Sophie.

Early life
Kim Victoria Cattrall was born on 21 August 1956 in the Mossley Hill area of Liverpool, the daughter of secretary Gladys Shane (née Baugh) and construction engineer Dennis Cattrall. She had a brother named Christopher (died 2018). When she was three months old, her family immigrated to Canada and settled in Courtenay, British Columbia. At age 11, she returned to Liverpool when her grandmother became sick. She took acting examinations at the London Academy of Music and Dramatic Art, but returned to Canada after one year and moved to New York City at the age of 16 for her first acting role.

Career

1972–2008 
Cattrall began her career after graduating from Georges P. Vanier Secondary School in 1972, when she left Canada for New York City. There, she attended the American Academy of Dramatic Arts, and upon her graduation signed a five-year film deal with director Otto Preminger. She made her film debut in Preminger's action thriller Rosebud (1975). A year later, Universal Studios bought out that contract and Cattrall became one of the last participants in the contract player system of Universal (also referenced as MCA/Universal during this period) before the system ended in 1980. The Universal system's representative in New York, Eleanor Kilgallen (sister of Dorothy Kilgallen), cast Cattrall in numerous television guest-star roles. One of the first jobs Kilgallen got her was in a 1977 episode of Quincy, M.E. starring Jack Klugman, whom Kilgallen also represented.

In 1978, Cattrall played the love interest of a murderous psychologist in an episode of Columbo and also in "Blindfold", an episode of the 1970s action series Starsky & Hutch, in which Starsky (played by Paul Michael Glaser) is grief-stricken since he accidentally blinded Cattrall's character, young artist Emily Harrison, by a shot of his gun. She starred in The Bastard (1978) and The Rebels (1979), two television miniseries based on the John Jakes novels of the same names. In 1979, she played the role of Dr. Gabrielle White on The Incredible Hulk and would go down in television Hulk lore as one of the few characters who knew David Banner (alter ego of the title character) was alive and was the creature. Her work in television paid off and she quickly made the transition to cinema. She starred opposite Jack Lemmon in his Oscar-nominated film Tribute (1980), and in Crossbar, the film about a high jumper who loses his leg and still participates in the Olympic trials, with Cattrall's help. The following year, she appeared in Ticket to Heaven.

In 1981, Cattrall played P.E. teacher Miss Honeywell in Porky's, followed three years later by a role in the original Police Academy. In 1985, she starred in three films: Turk 182, City Limits and Hold-Up, the last with French star Jean-Paul Belmondo. In 1986, she played Kurt Russell's brainy flame in the action film Big Trouble in Little China. In 1987, her lead role in the cult comedy film Mannequin proved a huge success with audiences. One of her best-known film roles is that of Lieutenant Valeris in Star Trek VI: The Undiscovered Country; Cattrall assisted in developing the character by designing her own hairstyle and even helped come up with the name.

Aside from her film work, Cattrall is also a stage actress, with performances in Arthur Miller's A View from the Bridge and Anton Chekhov's Three Sisters and Wild Honey to her credit. In addition, she can be heard reading the poetry of Rupert Brooke on the CD Red Rose Music SACD Sampler Volume One.

In 1997, she was cast in Sex and the City, Darren Star's series which was broadcast on HBO. As Samantha Jones, Cattrall gained international recognition. She capitalized on her success by appearing in steamy television commercials promoting Pepsi One. Sex and the City ran for six seasons and ended as a weekly series in spring 2004 with 10.6 million viewers. Cattrall reprised the role of Samantha Jones in the Sex and the City film, released on 30 May 2008. She also appeared in the sequel released in May 2010. For her role on the television series, she was nominated for five Emmy Awards, and four Golden Globe Awards, winning one in 2002. She also won two ensemble Screen Actors Guild Awards, shared with her co-stars Sarah Jessica Parker, Kristin Davis and Cynthia Nixon. However, she did reveal that she never got along with Sarah Jessica Parker. She was ranked number eight in TV Guides 50 sexiest stars of all-time list in 2005.  In 2008 she was honoured was the Cosmopolitan UK Ultimate Women Of The Year Awards with the Ultimate Icon Award for her role as 'Samantha' on the hit series.  She was also awarded the NBC Universal Canada Award of Distinction  at the 2008 Banff World TV Festival.

In 2005, she appeared in the Disney film Ice Princess, in which she played Tina Harwood, ice skating coach of the film's lead character. She portrayed Claire, a paralysed woman who wants to die, in the West End drama revival of Whose Life Is It Anyway?.  She was honoured that year by Glamour Magazine for the "Woman of the Year Awards" for Theatre Actress. In October 2006, she appeared to rave reviews in a West End production of David Mamet's The Cryptogram at the Donmar Warehouse in London. Since late 2005, she has appeared in a number of British television commercials for Tetley Tea. In July 2006, a commercial for Nissan cars, which featured Cattrall as Samantha Jones, was withdrawn from New Zealand television, apparently because of complaints about its innuendo. She later starred alongside Brendan Gleeson in John Boorman's film The Tiger's Tail (2006), a black comedy that focuses on the impact of the Celtic Tiger economy on Irish people. On ITV, she starred alongside David Haig, Daniel Radcliffe and Carey Mulligan in My Boy Jack, the story of author Rudyard Kipling's search for his son lost in the First World War.

2009–present 

In 2009, Cattrall played Amelia Bly in Roman Polanski's well-received The Ghost Writer and voiced the character Dee in the Canadian adult animated sitcom Producing Parker, the latter, for which she was awarded a Gemini for Best Performance in an Animated Program or Series in 2010. Later in 2009, it was announced that Cattrall would receive a star on Canada's Walk of Fame in Toronto, Ontario. The induction ceremony was held on 12 September 2009. In November 2009, while filming Sex and the City 2 in Marrakech, Morocco, she took part in a seminar, 'Being directed' with director John Boorman as part of the third edition of the Arts in Marrakech Festival. On 24 February 2010, Cattrall began a run in the West End of London at the Vaudeville Theatre as leading lady, Amanda, opposite Matthew Macfadyen, in a revival of Noël Coward's play Private Lives. She performed until 3 May 2010 and received a  2011 Whats on Stage nomination for "Best Actress." In the same year, Cattrall starred as Gloria Scabius (alongside Macfadyen once again) in the critically acclaimed Channel 4 adaptation of William Boyd's novel Any Human Heart.

Cattrall played Cleopatra in a production of Antony and Cleopatra, directed by Janet Suzman, opposite Jeffery Kissoon as Anthony, in Liverpool at the Playhouse in October 2010, with a subsequent revival at Chichester Festival Theatre (with Michael Pennington as Anthony) in September 2012. In 2010, Cattrall was named an Honorary Fellow of Liverpool John Moores University in recognition of her contributions to the dramatic arts. In 2011, Cattrall reprised her role as Amanda in a production of Noël Coward's Private Lives opposite Canadian actor Paul Gross in Toronto and on Broadway.   The New York Times theatre critic raved about Cattrall's performance and she received a Drama League Award nomination.  That year, Cattrall also appeared in Uptown Downstairs Abbey, the Comic Relief parody of the critically acclaimed historical television dramas Downton Abbey and Upstairs, Downstairs. Playing Lady Grantham, she starred alongside Jennifer Saunders, Joanna Lumley, Victoria Wood, Harry Enfield, Patrick Barlow, Dale Winton, Olivia Colman, Tim Vine, Simon Callow, Michael Gambon and Harry Hill.

From June to August 2013, Cattrall was scheduled to star in the Old Vic's production of Tennessee Williams's Sweet Bird of Youth, directed by Olivier Award-winner Marianne Elliott. In 2014, she starred and executive produced the HBO Canada's Sensitive Skin and adaptation pop the 2005 British Series.  In 2015 the show was nominated for an International Emmy Award. The show was nominated for numerous Canadian Screen Awards with Cattrall receiving a nomination in 2017 for her role as Davina Jackson in the series. The show is now available for streaming on Netflix.

On 17 July 2015, Cattrall was cast in the title role of Linda in a new play by Penelope Skinner, to be directed by Michael Longhurst and produced at London's Royal Court Theatre. She was forced to drop out of that production a few days before the opening, due to "chronic, debilitating insomnia". She returned to New York and started a program of cognitive behaviour therapy to train herself to be able to sleep better. The therapy was successful; it included developing certain evening rituals, removing electronic devices from her bedroom, and limiting the use of the bed to two activities, one of which would be sleeping. Meanwhile, for the scheduled December 2015 opening of Skinner's play, actress Noma Dumezweni took over the role to much acclaim and publicity. Cattrall opened up to the BBC Woman's Hour on her insomnia journey and how she was able to manage it. Cattrall later returned that year to guest edit the BBC's Woman's Hour to discuss "Choosing to Be Child Free" and "Being a Parent Without Giving Birth" which raised controversial response and opinions.  She was also seen in 2015 on the SkyArts short Ruby Robinson, a physical comedy where Cattrall starred as Ruby, a woman living with a troupe of unusual acrobat helpers, who is taught a valuable lesson by her nephew.

Catrall took part in the BBC Arts' I'm with the Banned, the flagship event in Belarus Free Theatre's (BFT) tenth-anniversary celebrations. Commissioned by The Space, the concert took place at London's KOKO and was broadcast worldwide. Radical underground company BFT brought together a unique line-up of musicians and performers to stand up for artistic freedom of expression and against injustice.

In 2016, Cattrall starred in the BBC mini-series The Witness for the Prosecution based on the Agatha Christie short story.  The celebrated two part mini-series  was nominated for a 2017 BAFTA  award for "Best Mini-Series."  In 2017 Cattrall also joined the cast of the hit  Swedish TV Show Modus, playing the President of the United States. Modus first aired in Sweden in 2015 and was later broadcast by BBC Four in the UK. The show also airs in Canada, Australia, France and Japan and is handled by FremantleMedia International.

In 2020, Cattrall returned to TV in the Fox Drama Filthy Rich, where she played Margaret Monreaux, the matriarch of a Southern family which has become mega-rich and famous for creating a wildly successful Christian television network. After her husband dies in a plane crash, Margaret and family are stunned to learn that he fathered three illegitimate children, all of whom are written into his will — threatening their family name and fortune. Cattrall also served as a producer on the series. Cattrall was honoured at the 2020 Atlanta TV festival with the Icon Award for the show.

In September 2021, Cattrall joined Robert De Niro in comedy film  About My Father inspired by the life of stand-up comedian, Sebastian Maniscalco, who also stars. In November 2021, Cattrall featured prominently in the permanent exhibition Wondrous Place celebrating Liverpool's cultural heritage. Cattrall did not appear in the 2021 Sex and the City reboot And Just Like That... due to disagreements with the storyline.

In May 2021, Catrall joined the cast of How I Met Your Mother spinoff series, How I Met Your Father led by Hilary Duff. She was cast in the pivotal narrator role originated by Bob Saget. The series was released on January 18, 2022. On February 15, 2022, Hulu renewed the series for a 20-episode second season.

Personal life

Cattrall has been married three times. Her first marriage, from 1977 to 1979, was to Larry Davis, but was annulled. Her second marriage, from 1982 to 1989, was to Andre J. Lyson; the couple lived in Frankfurt, where she learned to speak German fluently, but she admits she has forgotten a lot over the years. Her third marriage, from 1998 to 2004, was to American audio equipment designer Mark Levinson; the couple co-wrote the book Satisfaction: The Art of the Female Orgasm (2002).

Cattrall briefly dated former Canadian Prime Minister Pierre Trudeau (and in 2016 was misidentified on 60 Minutes, from a 1981 photo, as Margaret, the mother of his son Justin). She has also been connected to Brazilian-American actor Daniel Benzali, American musician Gerald Casale, French public intellectual Bernard-Henri Lévy, and British-Sudanese actor Alexander Siddig. She has been dating BBC employee Russell Thomas since 2016.

Cattrall has held dual British and Canadian citizenship for most of her life and became an American citizen in 2020 in order to vote in that year's election.

In August 2009, Cattrall took part in the BBC One documentary series Who Do You Think You Are? She discovered that her grandfather George Baugh disappeared in 1938, having abandoned his family (including Cattrall's then eight-year-old mother and her two younger sisters) and turned out to have bigamously married his new wife the following year in Tudhoe; he subsequently had another four children. Cattrall was told that Baugh emigrated to Australia in 1961, became a postmaster, retired in 1972, and died in Sydney in 1974. Her mother and aunts had known nothing of their father's life after he left until they heard what the Who Do You Think You Are? researchers had discovered, nor had the family previously seen a clear photograph of him. An edited version of the episode was later shown as a part of the U.S. series of the same name.

In 2018, Cattrall joined Judi Dench as an ambassador for the Royal Botanical Kew Gardens in London, the largest and most diverse botanical and mycological collections in the world.

Cattrall has been honored with two honorary degrees; an Honorary Fellowship from Liverpool John Moores University in 2010 and one from the University of British Columbia in 2018.

On 4 February 2018, Cattrall announced that her brother Christopher had disappeared in Alberta. She asked for public help in finding him, but he was found dead several hours later, having taken his own life.

Filmography

Film

Television

Music videos

Theatre

Awards and nominations

References

External links

 
 

 
 
 
 

1956 births
Living people
20th-century Canadian actresses
21st-century Canadian actresses
Actresses from British Columbia
Actresses from Liverpool
Alumni of the London Academy of Music and Dramatic Art
American Academy of Dramatic Arts alumni
American people of English descent
American expatriates in England
Best Supporting Actress Golden Globe (television) winners
Canadian expatriate actresses in the United States
Canadian expatriates in England
Canadian film actresses
Canadian stage actresses
Canadian television actresses
Canadian voice actresses
English emigrants to Canada
Naturalized citizens of Canada
Naturalized citizens of the United States
People from Courtenay, British Columbia
20th-century English women
20th-century English people
21st-century English women
21st-century English people
People with acquired Canadian citizenship